Ekrem Boyalı (born 15 July 1970) is an Olympian Turkish former Taekwondo practitioner and coach.

Early years and family life
Ekrem Boyalı was born on 15 July 1970 in Konya, Turkey. In 1998, Boyalı went to the United States to complete his university education. Upon returning home after three years, he was appointed a lecturer at Selçuk University in Konya. In 2009, he earned a PhD degree in Exercise physiology from the Institute of Health Science at Selçuk University with a thesis on "The effect of vitamin E application on the levels of lipid peroxidation, antioxidant enzymes and lactate during acute Taekwondo exercise".

He is married with Ayşegül Ergin, also a world and European championship medalist.

Sports career
He began with Taekwondo following the footsteps of his older brother Osman Boyalı in 1983. After four years of hard training at his brother's sports club, he was admitted to the national team. Later, he became captain of the Turkey team.

At the 1992 Summer Olympics in Barcelona, Spain, he competed for Turkey, and became the runner-up after losing to Kim Byong-Cheol from South Korea in the final game. The Taekwondo competitions were held as demonstration sport, and therefore no medals were awarded.

Boyalı served as coach of the Turkey national team after leaving the active sport. Later, he coached the Bulgaria national team.

Achievements
  1988 European Championships – Ankara, Turkey −54 kg (youth)
  1990 European Championships – Aarhus, Denmark −54 kg
  1991 World Cup – Zagreb, Croatia −58 kg
  1991 World Championships – Athens, Greece −58 kg
  1992 European Championships – Valencia, Spain −64 kg
  1992 Pre-Olympian Games – Barcelona, Spain −64 kg
  1994 World Cup – George Town, Cayman Islands, United Kingdom −64 kg
  1996 European Championships – Helsinki, Finland −64 kg
  1997 World Championships – Hong Kong, British Hong Kong −64 kg

References

1970 births
Sportspeople from Konya
Turkish male taekwondo practitioners
Turkish martial artists
Olympic taekwondo practitioners of Turkey
Taekwondo practitioners at the 1992 Summer Olympics
Turkish sports coaches
Selçuk University alumni
Academic staff of Selçuk University
Living people
European Taekwondo Championships medalists
World Taekwondo Championships medalists
21st-century Turkish people